Callanthias is a genus of splendid perches primarily found in subtropical parts of the Pacific Ocean, but C. allporti just barely penetrates the southeast Indian Ocean, C. legras is found in the southeast Atlantic, and C. ruber is found in the northeast Atlantic, including the Mediterranean.

They are brightly marked in orange, pink, yellow and blue, and reach  depending on the species involved.

Species
Despite being in separate families, some Callanthias have been included in the genus Anthias in the past. There are currently 7 recognized species in this genus:
 Callanthias allporti Günther, 1876 (Southern splendid perch)
 Callanthias australis J. D. Ogilby, 1899 (Magnificent splendid perch)
 Callanthias japonicus V. Franz, 1910 (Japanese splendid perch)
 Callanthias legras J. L. B. Smith, 1948 (Atlantic splendid perch)
 Callanthias parini W. D. Anderson & G. D. Johnson, 1984 (Nazca splendid perch)
 Callanthias platei Steindachner, 1898 (Juan Fernández splendid perch)
 Callanthias ruber (Rafinesque, 1810) (Parrot seaperch)

References

Callanthiidae